According to the Book of Mormon, Zeram, Amnor, Manti, and Limher were Nephite spies who lived in the 1st century BC, and, under the direction of Alma, were sent to spy on the camp of the Amlicites during the war between the Nephites and that people. These four spies witnessed the joining of the Amlicites with the Lamanites, and reported to the event to Alma, after which the Nephite army hastened back to Zarahemla in retreat.

References

Book of Mormon people
Cultural depictions of spies